The 1978 Maryland gubernatorial election was held on November 7, 1978. Democratic nominee Harry Hughes defeated Republican nominee John Glenn Beall Jr. with 70.62% of the vote.

Primary elections
Primary elections were held on September 12, 1978.

Democratic primary

Candidates
Harry Hughes, former State Senator
Blair Lee III, incumbent Lieutenant Governor
Ted Venetoulis, County Executive of Baltimore County
Walter S. Orlinsky, President of the Baltimore City Council

Results

Republican primary

Candidates
John Glenn Beall Jr., former United States Senator
Carlton Beall, former Postmaster General of Washington, D.C.
Louise Gore, former State Senator
Ross Zimmerman Pierpont, perennial candidate

Results

General election

Candidates
Harry Hughes, Democratic
John Glenn Beall Jr., Republican

Results

References

1978
Maryland
Gubernatorial